Laszlo Kovacs (born 1 April 1971) is an Australian wrestler. He competed in the men's Greco-Roman 130 kg at the 2000 Summer Olympics, where he placed 18th.

References

External links
 

1971 births
Living people
Australian male sport wrestlers
Olympic wrestlers of Australia
Wrestlers at the 2000 Summer Olympics
People from Nagykanizsa